Epsom Common is a   Local Nature Reserve in Epsom in Surrey. It is owned and managed by Epsom and Ewell Borough Council. It is part of Epsom and Ashtead Commons, a Site of Special Scientific Interest.

This is a nationally important wildlife location because it is a breeding site for birds. Moreover, insects endemic to the area depend on the dead wood on location. Other fauna include roe deer, herons and purple emperor butterflies. Additionally, there are flora such as common spotted orchids and southern marsh orchids.

The Thames Down Link long distance footpath from Kingston upon Thames to Box Hill & Westhumble station runs through the common.

References

Local Nature Reserves in Surrey
Parks and open spaces in Surrey
Epsom